Spyder may refer to:

Arts and media
 Spyder, a minor Myth Adventures character
 Spyder (film), a Telugu/Tamil bilingual film directed by A. R. Murugadoss starring Mahesh Babu
 Spyder Games, an MTV television series
 Spyder (song), a 1996 Imperial Drag song off their album Imperial Drag (album)
 SPYDER, the villain in the book series Spy School by Stuart Gibbs

Automotive 
''See also 
 Roadster (automobile), a type of car
 Porsche 550 Spyder, a very successful race-purpose car from the 1950s
 Chevrolet Corvair Monza Spyder, a turbocharged version of the Chevrolet Corvair
 Chevrolet Monza Spyder, a performance package version of the 1975–1980 subcompact, four-passenger automobile
 Lamborghini Gallardo Spyder, a production model of the Lamborghini Gallardo
 Mitsubishi 3000GT Spyder, a 2-door hard top convertible version of the Mitsubishi 3000 GT
 Mitsubishi Eclipse Spyder, a 2-door convertible version of the Mitsubishi Eclipse
 BRP Can-Am Spyder Roadster, a three-wheeled motor vehicle manufactured by Can-Am
 Toyota MR2, the third generation of which was known as the Spyder in the U.S.

People 
 Spyder Turner (born 1947), American soul singer
 Spyder Jonez, screen name of pornographic actor Evan Seinfeld
 Joe "Spyder" Lester, current bassist for the American rock band Steel Panther

Technology

 SPYDER, an anti-aircraft missile-system
 Spyder (software), an open-source IDE for the Python programming-language
 Spyder, codename for the Motorola Droid Razr, an Android smartphone

Other uses 
 Spyder (ski apparel brand)
 Spyder MR1, MR2, and Spyder Rodeo, paintball markers

See also
 Spider (disambiguation)
 SPDR (disambiguation)